The 2019 Bowling Green Falcons football team represented Bowling Green State University during the 2019 NCAA Division I FBS football season. The Falcons were led by first-year head coach Scot Loeffler and played their home games at Doyt Perry Stadium in Bowling Green, Ohio. They competed as members of the East Division of the Mid-American Conference (MAC).

Preseason

Coaching changes
Seven games into the 2018 season, Bowling Green fired third-year head coach Mike Jinks; defensive coordinator Carl Pelini served as interim head coach for the remainder of the season. On November 28, 2018, the school announced that Scot Loeffler had been hired to become the new head coach. Loeffler had spent the previous three seasons as the offensive coordinator and quarterbacks coach at Boston College. On December 4, Loeffler announced that he would retain Pelini as defensive coordinator and hired former Western Michigan tight ends coach Terry Malone to be the new offensive coordinator. On December 10, former Louisville defensive coordinator Brian VanGorder was announced as the new linebackers coach. He was promoted to defensive coordinator in February 2019 after Carl Pelini left to pursue other opportunities.

MAC media poll
The MAC released their preseason media poll on July 23, 2019, with the Falcons predicted to finish in sixth place in the East Division.

Schedule
Bowling Green's non-conference schedule will consist of home games against Morgan State of the Mid-Eastern Athletic Conference (MEAC) and Louisiana Tech of Conference USA; and road games against Kansas State of the Big 12 Conference and Notre Dame, a football independent.

In Mid-American Conference play, the Falcons will play home games against Toledo, Central Michigan, Akron, and Ohio; and road games against Kent State, Western Michigan, Miami, and Buffalo. They will not play games against West Division members Ball State, Eastern Michigan, or Northern Illinois during the regular season.

Game summaries

Morgan State

at Kansas State

Bowling Green managed 140 total yards (79 passing and 61 rushing) and completed just 8 of 19 passes.    Kansas State led 31-0 and put up over 300 yards of total offense before the game was halfway through the second quarter.  Kansas State ended up with 521 total yards by the end of the game and the final score was Kansas State 52, Bowling Green 0.  The shutout was Bowling Green’s first since losing 37-0 at Virginia Tech in 2012.

Louisiana Tech

at Kent State

at Notre Dame

Toledo

Bowling Green broke their 9-year drought with their first victory in the Battle of I-75 rivalry since 2009.

Central Michigan

at Western Michigan

Akron

at Miami (OH)

Ohio

at Buffalo

References

Bowling Green
Bowling Green Falcons football seasons
Bowling Green Falcons football